Facundo Bagnis and Thomaz Bellucci were the defending champions, but Bellucci chose not to participate.  Bagnis played alongside Marco Cecchinato, but lost in the first round to Michael Berrer and Alexander Zverev.
Mateusz Kowalczyk and Artem Sitak won the title, defeating Guillermo García-López and Philipp Oswald in the final, 2–6, 6–1, [10–7].

Seeds

Draw

Draw

References

External links
 Main draw

Stuttgart Open - Doubles
Doubles 2014